Élver James Melchor Bañol (born 1976) is a Colombian rapist and serial killer. He was convicted of 7 rapes and 4 murders, one of them being that of Rosmery Castellón, a minor.

Nicknamed The Predator of Picaleña, he was compared to the infamous Luis Garavito for the way he acted and approached his victims, all of whom were underage children. Melchor Bañol was initially sentenced to 40 years' imprisonment for three unrelated crimes, but after his last murder, he was given 60 years' imprisonment, the highest-available sentence in Colombian law.

Profile 
According to authorities and specialized investigators, Elver acted in the same way as his renowned Colombian counterpart Luis Garavito: he had a habit of stalking minors and adolescents he had picked out, before eventually raping and murdering them.

Rosmery Castellón case 
Melchor Bañol confessed to having kidnapped, raped, tortured and murdered 16-year-old Rosmery Castellón in the Tolima Department on February 26, 2019. In his own words, he told the authorities that he had strong sexual urges at that moment, so he decided to kidnap young Rosmery: "The devil entered me and there was nothing else to do." Policemen later found her body in the Vereda Aparco sector, with obvious signs of rape and torture. Melchor was prosecuted for kidnapping, torture, violation of a corpse and femicide, for which he was convicted and sentenced to 60 years' imprisonment, the harshest sentence in the country.

See also 
 Luis Garavito
 List of serial killers in Colombia

References 

1976 births
21st-century criminals
Colombian murderers of children
Colombian people convicted of murder
Colombian people convicted of rape
Colombian rapists
Colombian serial killers
Living people
Male serial killers
People convicted of child sexual abuse
People convicted of murder by Colombia
Prisoners and detainees of Colombia